State Highway 150 (SH 150)  is an east–west highway in southeastern Texas beginning in New Waverly, starting at Interstate 45 and proceeds east going through Coldspring, where it turns southeast to Shepherd and terminates at Future Interstate 69/US 59. This route was designated on March 19, 1930 along its current route, replacing SH 45A and part of a branch of SH 45. On October 26, 1962, SH 150 was extended from US 75 to IH-45.

Major intersections

References

150
Transportation in Walker County, Texas
Transportation in San Jacinto County, Texas